Peter Andreas Larsson (born 13 August 1974) is a Swedish handball player who competed in the 1996 Summer Olympics and in the 2000 Summer Olympics.

He was born in Locketorp, Skövde.

In 1996 he was a member of the Swedish handball team won the silver medal in the Olympic tournament. He played two matches and scored six goals.

Four years later he was part of the Swedish team which won the silver medal again. He played seven matches and scored 17 goals.

References
 

1974 births
Living people
Swedish male handball players
Olympic handball players of Sweden
Handball players at the 1996 Summer Olympics
Handball players at the 2000 Summer Olympics
Olympic silver medalists for Sweden
Swedish expatriate sportspeople in Germany
Olympic medalists in handball
Medalists at the 2000 Summer Olympics
Medalists at the 1996 Summer Olympics